1997 Urawa Red Diamonds season

Competitions

Domestic results

J.League

Emperor's Cup

J.League Cup

Player statistics

 † player(s) joined the team after the opening of this season.

Transfers

In:

Out:

Transfers during the season

In
Alfred Nijhuis (from MSV Duisburg on July)
Aitor Begiristain Mújica (from Deportivo La Coruña on July)
Željko Petrović (from PSV Eindhoven on November)

Out
Baur (to Tirol Innsbruck on May)
Tomoyasu Ando (loan to Avispa Fukuoka on September)

Awards
none

References
J.LEAGUE OFFICIAL GUIDE 1997, 1997 
J.LEAGUE OFFICIAL GUIDE 1998, 1996 
J.LEAGUE YEARBOOK 1999, 1999 
URAWA REDS Official History 1992–2002 浦和レッズ10年史, ベースボール・マガジン社, 2002 
 R-File｜浦和レッドダイヤモンズ公式サイト｜URAWA RED DIAMONDS OFFICIAL WEBSITE

Other pages
 J. League official site
 Urawa Red Diamonds official site

Urawa Red Diamonds
Urawa Red Diamonds seasons